Dahisar Assembly constituency is one of the 288 Vidhan Sabha (Legislative Assembly) constituencies in Maharashtra state in western India.

Overview
Dahisar constituency is one of the 26 Vidhan Sabha constituencies located in the Mumbai Suburban district.

Dahisar is part of the Mumbai North Lok Sabha constituency along with five other Vidhan Sabha segments, namely Borivali, Magathane, Kandivali East, Charkop and Malad West in the Mumbai Suburban district.

Members of Legislative Assembly

Election results

2019 results

2014 results

2009 results

See also
 Dahisar
 List of constituencies of Maharashtra Vidhan Sabha

References

Assembly constituencies of Mumbai
Politics of Mumbai Suburban district
Assembly constituencies of Maharashtra